Claire Elizabeth Falknor (born May 12, 1993) is an American professional soccer player who plays as a midfielder for Spanish Primera División club Granadilla Tenerife. She previously played for the University of Florida, where she was named third-team NSCAA All-American and first-team All-SEC in 2015 and second team all-SEC in 2014.

Early life
Born in Dayton, Ohio, Falknor attended Centerville High School (class of 2012) and played with the Ohio South State Olympic Development Program (ODP) team from 2008 to 2010 and with the Ohio Elite Soccer Academy club side from 2010 to 2012.

Playing career

Club
In January 2016, Falknor joined Frauen-Bundesliga side Bayern Munich. She made her professional debut on February 13, coming on as an 83rd-minute substitute for Mana Iwabuchi against Köln.

Falknor and Bayern Munich mutually dissolved her contract in December 2016, and Bayern announced that she was returning to the United States.

On February 24, 2017, Falknor signed with the Houston Dash.

On June 18, 2018, Falknor was waived by the Dash to make room on the roster for the newly acquired Sofia Huerta and Taylor Comeau. On July 4, 2018, it was announced that Falknor would be joining EDF Logroño in the Primera División in Spain. She left the team at the end of the season.

International
In May 2015, Falknor was named to the United States under-23 national team for the Four Nations Tournament in Norway. She played in two of the three matches.

References

External links

 University of Florida profile
 US Soccer profile
 Bayern profile 

1993 births
Living people
Women's association football defenders
American women's soccer players
Soccer players from Ohio
Sportspeople from Dayton, Ohio
Florida Gators women's soccer players
Frauen-Bundesliga players
FC Bayern Munich (women) players
2. Frauen-Bundesliga players
National Women's Soccer League players
Houston Dash players
Primera División (women) players
EdF Logroño players
American expatriate women's soccer players
American expatriate soccer players in Germany
American expatriate sportspeople in Spain
Expatriate women's footballers in Spain
Sevilla FC (women) players